Football Club Internazionale Milano is an Italian professional football club based in Milan, Lombardy. The club was founded on 9 March 1908 as a split between the Milan Cricket and football club. They played their first competitive match on the 10 January 1909 against fellow Milan team A.C. Milan. The following year, they won their first piece of silverware with the team defeating Pro Vercelli in a championship play-off.

This is a list of seasons played by Inter Milan in Italian and European football. It details the club's achievements in major competitions, managers, and top league goalscorers for each season.

Key

 CL = UEFA Champions League
 EC = European Cup
 EL = UEFA Europa League
 UC = UEFA Cup
 ICFC = Inter-Cities Fairs Cup
 CWC = European Cup Winners' Cup
 USC = UEFA Super Cup
 IC = Intercontinental Cup
 FCWC = FIFA Club World Cup
 MIT = Mitropa Cup

 Pld = Matches played
 W = Matches won
 D = Matches drawn
 L = Matches lost
 GF = Goals for
 GA = Goals against
 Pts = Points
 Pos = Final position

 F = Final
 SF = Semi-finals
 QF = Quarter-finals
 R16 = Round of 16
 R32 = Round of 32
 GS = Group stage
 GS2 = Second group stage
 – = Did not qualify/Tournament did not occur

 QR1 = First qualifying round
 QR2 = Second qualifying round
 QR3 = Third qualifying round
 QR4 = Fourth qualifying round
 RInt = Intermediate round
 R1 = Round 1
 R2 = Round 2
 R3 = Round 3
 R4 = Round 4
 R5 = Round 5
 R6 = Round 6

Seasons 
Correct as of the end of the 2021–22 season.

1. For details of league structure, see Italian football league system.
2. The first edition was held in 1922, but the second champions were not crowned until 1936.
3. The first edition was held in 1988.
4. Only league goals are counted. The Serie A Golden Boot known as Capocannoniere (plural: capocannonieri) is the award given to the highest goalscorer in Serie A.

Footnotes 

 
Seasons
Inter Milan